Brontez Purnell is an American writer, musician, dancer, and director based out of Oakland, California. He is the author of several books, including Since I Laid My Burden Down (2017), and the zine Fag School; frontman for the punk band The Younger Lovers; and founder of the Brontez Purnell Dance Company. He is a recipient of the 2022 Lambda Literary Award for Gay Fiction for his novel 100 Boy Friends.

Biography
Purnell grew up in Triana, Alabama where he created his first zine Schlepp Fanzine, when he was 14 years old. After moving to Oakland at 19, he created Fag School out of "wanting there to be a Sassy for gay boys." "I hadn't really seen a zine or at least a personal gay zine that dealt with the difficult subject of gay sex with both humor and frank talk. It covered some real issues."

His electro rock band Gravy Train!!!! gained national prominence for their live shows. His punk band The Younger Lovers started in 2003 as a bedroom demo project.

Awards
In 2018, Purnell was awarded a Whiting Award for fiction.

Focus
Much of his work focuses on sex and sexuality. "In my work I try to use 'sex' or the body as this thing that does not create boundaries or separation with an audience, but instead gives my audience back their humanity." He is gay.

On June 1, 2021, he was named a winner of the Jim Duggins Outstanding Mid-Career Novelists' Prize from the Lambda Literary Foundation.

Bibliography 

 The Cruising Diaries (2014)
 Johnny Would You Love Me if My Dick Were Bigger (2015)
 Since I Laid My Burden Down (2017)
 100 Boyfriends (2021)

References 

Living people
American punk rock musicians
Musicians from Alabama
Writers from Alabama
American LGBT musicians
LGBT people from Alabama
American gay writers
LGBT African Americans
21st-century LGBT people
1982 births